Any Human Heart is a British drama television serial, based on the 2002 novel of the same name by William Boyd. It was announced in April 2010, and was broadcast on Channel 4 from 21 November to 12 December 2010, consisting of four episodes of one hour each. A re-edited version aired in the United States on 13, 20 and 27 February 2011 (three one-and-a-half-hour episodes) on PBS.

The serial was awarded Best Drama Serial at the British Academy Television Awards 2011. It was released on DVD on 27 December 2010 and in the US (Region 1) on 5 April 2011.

Cast and characters
 Jim Broadbent as Logan Mountstuart (older)
 Matthew Macfadyen as Logan Mountstuart (middle)
 Sam Claflin as Logan Mountstuart (young)
 Conor Nealon as Logan Mountstuart (child)
 Hayley Atwell as Freya Deverell
 Ed Stoppard as Ben Leeping (older)
 Samuel West as Peter Scabius (older)
 Gillian Anderson as Wallis, Duchess of Windsor
 Tom Hollander as Edward, Duke of Windsor
 Kim Cattrall as Gloria Scabius
 Holliday Grainger as Tess Scabius
 Tobias Menzies as Ian Fleming
 Charity Wakefield as Land Fothergill
 Emerald Fennell as Lottie
 Stanley Weber as Swiss Detective
 Valerie Kaprisky as Gabrielle Dupetit
 Theo Cross as Nat Tate
 Tim Flavin as Schmidt
 Oscar Foronda as Faustino Angel

Soundtrack
The original music from the series was scored by composer Dan Jones, with performances by the Chamber Orchestra of London, Roger Huckle and John Parricelli. In 2011 it won the BAFTA award for Best Original Television Music and Best Television Soundtrack at the Ivor Novello Awards, and was nominated for best Original Dramatic Score and Outstanding Original Main Title Theme Music at the Emmys. The soundtrack was released in February 2017 by Wave Theory Records.

References

External links
 Any Human Heart on Channel 4
 Any Human Heart on PBS
 

2010s British drama television series
2010s British television miniseries
2010 British television series debuts
2010 British television series endings
BAFTA winners (television series)
British drama television series
Channel 4 miniseries
Channel 4 television dramas
English-language television shows
Films with screenplays by William Boyd (writer)
Television shows based on British novels
Television series set in the 20th century
Television shows set in London
Television shows set in New York City
Television shows set in Paris